Semeraro is a surname. Notable people with the surname include:

Domenico Semeraro (born 1964), Swiss bobsledder
Marcello Semeraro (born 1947), Italian Roman Catholic cardinal
Paolo Semeraro (born 1962), Italian sailor
Silvia Semeraro (born 1996), Italian karateka